Carmine Soel Chiappetta (born 9 March 2003) is a Swiss professional footballer who plays as a forward for Swiss Super League club Winterthur, on loan from Basel.

Club career
A youth academy graduate of Basel, Chiappetta made his professional debut on 21 November 2020 in a 2–1 league defeat against Young Boys.

On 20 January 2022, Chiappetta was loaned to Winterthur until the summer of 2023.

International career
Chiappetta is a current Swiss youth international.

References

External links
 
 Profile at sfl.ch
 Under-16 Profile at football.ch
 Under-17 Profile at football.ch

2003 births
Living people
Association football forwards
Swiss men's footballers
Switzerland youth international footballers
FC Basel players
FC Winterthur players
Swiss Super League players
Swiss Promotion League players
People from Wetzikon
Sportspeople from the canton of Zürich